

References

 
United States federal policy